Cabat is a surname. Notable people with the surname include:

Erni Cabat (1914–1994), American artist
Louis-Nicolas Cabat (1812–1893), French painter
Rose Cabat (1914–2015), American ceramicist, wife of Erni